Wendy Brenner is an American writer of fiction and nonfiction and an Associate Professor at University of North Carolina Wilmington. Brenner is the author of two books, the first of which won the Flannery O'Connor Award for Short Fiction.  Her short stories and essays have appeared in such magazines as Allure, Seventeen, Travel & Leisure, The Oxford American, The Sun (magazine), Ploughshares, and Mississippi Review, and have been anthologized in The Best American Essays, Best American Magazine Writing, and New Stories From the South, as well as other anthologies.  She is the recipient of a National Endowment for the Arts Fellowship for her fiction, and is a Contributing Editor for  The Oxford American. In 2016, she was named one of the "Queens of Nonfiction: 56 Women Journalists Everyone Should Read" on New York magazine's "The Cut" blog.

Bibliography

Books 
Phone Calls From the Dead (2001)
Large Animals in Everyday Life: Stories (1997)

Education 
 Master of Fine Arts from the University of Florida, 1991.
 Bachelor of Arts from Oberlin College, 1987.

Awards 
 Flannery O'Connor Award for Short Fiction  (for Large Animals In Everyday Life)
 National Magazine Award Finalist, 2006
 National Endowment for the Arts Fellowship
 Associated Writing Programs Intro Award
 Transatlantic Review/Henfield Foundation Award.

References 
UNCW Department of Creative Writing faculty
University of Florida info about alumni

Footnotes 

University of Florida alumni
Oberlin College alumni
Living people
Year of birth missing (living people)